This list is incomplete, you can help Wikipedia by expanding it.

List of the tributaries of the Colorado River of Texas, that flows in the south-central United States to the Gulf of Mexico.

Tributaries
The river's principal tributaries are the Concho River, Pecan Bayou, Llano River, San Saba River, and Pedernales River.

List
Tributaries are (from source to mouth):
Concho River
Pecan Bayou
Llano River
San Saba River
Pedernales River
Bull Creek
Barton Creek
Shoal Creek
Waller Creek
Boggy Creek
Walnut Creek
Onion Creek
Cedar Creek
Piney Creek

See also

Tributaries of the Colorado River (Texas)

 

Colorado River
Colorado River